Kim Jeong-nam or Kim Jong-nam may refer to:

 Kim Jeong-nam (futsal), player for the South Korea national team at events such as the 2012 AFC Futsal Championship
 Kim Jung-nam (born 1943), South Korean footballer
 Kim Jong-nam (weightlifter) (born 1969), North Korean weightlifter; see 1990 World Weightlifting Championships
 Kim Jong-nam (1971–2017), North Korean leader Kim Jong-un's brother
 Kim Jeong-nam (rower) (born 1963), South Korean Olympic rower